Julius Soubise (1754 – 25 August 1798) was a formerly enslaved Afro-Caribbean man and a well-known fop in late eighteenth-century Britain. The satirized depiction of Soubise, A Mungo Macaroni, is a relic of intersectionality between race, class, and gender in eighteenth-century London. His life of luxury as a free man of colour allowed him to excel in elite activities such as fencing and made him notorious in London's social scene as an exception to norms.

Biography
Soubise was born on the island of St. Kitts in the Caribbean, the son of an enslaved Jamaican woman. He was bought by Royal Navy Captain Stair Douglas and taken to England, enslaved, at ten years of age, under the name Othello. In 1764, he was given to Catherine Douglas, Duchess of Queensberry, Captain Douglas' relative and an eccentric emblem of London's high society, who manumitted him. He was renamed after a French duke, Charles de Rohan, by the Duchess. She gave Soubise a privileged life, treating him as if he were her own son – apparently with her husband Charles Douglas, 3rd Duke of Queensberry's blessing.

Trained by Domenico Angelo (whom Soubise also regularly accompanied as usher to Eton and Windsor), Soubise became the riding and fencing master to the Duchess. He became a popular acquaintance among young noblemen and rose as a figure in upper-class social circles, becoming the member of many fashionable clubs such as the Thatched House Club. The personal favour and patronage of the Duchess allowed Soubise a lifestyle of socializing and fashion. He would sometimes style himself  as "Prince Ana-Ana-maboe" or "The Black Prince", claiming to be African royalty. It was rumoured that his relationship with the Duchess developed into a sexual one.

In the collected letters of the famous freed slave Ignatius Sancho, Letter XIIII (dated 11 October 1772) is addressed to Soubise, whom Sancho encourages to consider his lucky position as an unusually privileged black person and so live a more seemly life.

However, on 15 July 1777 Soubise fled Britain for India. Historical accounts dispute whether he was sent away simply to amend his debauchery or to evade a rape accusation from a maid of the Duchess’. The Duchess died two days after his departure. In India, he founded a fencing and riding school in Calcutta, Bengal which he advertised as open to men and women students. On 25 August 1798, Soubise fell while attempting to break in a horse, the injury causing his death . He was the father of two known children, Mary and William Soubise, with an unnamed mother.

Caricature depictions 

Soubise became socially prominent enough to become the subject of several caricatures. Most notably, Soubise is attributed as the muse for A Mungo Macaroni (published on 10 September 1772), part of a famous 1771–1773 satirical series of engravings depicting fashionable young men, published by Matthew and Mary Darly. The term "macaroni" was a contemporary name for a fashionable young man, a dandy, while "Mungo" was a name of an officious slave from the 1769 comic opera The Padlock by Isaac Bickerstaffe. In previous contexts, use of the term "mungo" was often aimed towards luxury slaves, an application of the character to those treated theatrically like elite's pets. Applying the epithet to Soubise in combination with "macaroni" was intended to mock the identity he had assumed for himself.

William Austin's well-known satirical print, The Duchess of Queensbury and Soubise (published 1 May 1773) shows the pair engaged in a fencing match.  Austin's engraving was based on illustrations of fencing compiled by the Angelo fencing dynasty, combined with accounts of Soubise from Henry Angelo’s memoir. These accounts were satirized by Austin in a way which addresses Soubise and the duchess’ uncustomary relationship, depicting Soubise as Mungo the servant. In the print, text shows Soubise saying, “Mungo here, Mungo dere, Mungo every where; Above and below. Hah! Vat your gracy tink of me now?,”  direct lines from the Mungo character. This work has reappeared historically under several titles, including “The Eccentric Duchess of Queensbury fencing with her protégé the Creole Soubise (otherwise ‘Mungo’)” and “The Duchess of Queensberry playing at foils with her favourite Lap Dog Mungo after Expending near £10,000 to make him a—.”

Arts and education 
In his work as an actor, Soubise is suggested to have had runs in the role of Othello as well as the character Mungo from The Padlock, characters historically most often played by white actors in blackface. However, such reports come from Hicky's Bengal Gazette, which could have posited this satirically to mock Soubise's status. Soubise was strongly associated with these characters throughout his time in the elite social sphere, labelled by others because he was a black actor, punctuated by his depiction in A Mungo Macaroni.

Soubise received instruction in the privileged accomplishments of riding and fencing, taught by fencing master Domenico Angelo per Duchess Douglas’ connections. He was also known as an amateur violinist, singer and actor – he was taught oration by the famous actor David Garrick.

Fashion 
Soubise's styles were likened to other fops of the time, often characterized by the French influence he also granted his namesake. A Mungo Macaroni depicts Soubise sporting a luxurious hat, ruffles, a cane, and an adorned sword. He was known to wear large powdered wigs, fine fabrics such as silk, and styles fitted tightly to his body. There are also accounts of him wearing diamond-buckled shoes with red heels. Such styles meant that Soubise and other fops were associated with effeminacy and excess, supported by the caricatures, but Soubise also assumed a unique black identity that could be associated with extravagance.

See also
Black British elite, the class that Soubise belonged to

References

Further reading

 Julius Soubise
 Edwards, P., and Walvin, J., Black Personalities in the Era of the Slave Trade, London, 1983.
 Shyllon, Folarin, Black People in Britain 1555–1833, London, New York and Ibadan: Oxford University Press and the Institute of Race Relations, 1977.

1754 births
1798 deaths
Saint Kitts and Nevis slaves
English people of Saint Kitts and Nevis descent
English people of Jamaican descent
Black British musicians
Black British male actors
Black British former slaves
Accidental deaths in India
Deaths by horse-riding accident in India
18th-century British male actors